Dudaia is a genus of flies belonging to the family Sphaeroceridae, the lesser dung flies.

Species
D. congoensis (Vanschuytbroeck, 1950)
D. flavocincta (Duda, 1923)
D. humeralis (Hackman, 1965)
D. jeanneli (Richards, 1938)
D. keiseri (Hackman, 1967)
D. minima (Vanschuytbroeck, 1959)
D. simulatilis (Richards, 1980)
D. straeleni (Vanschuytbroeck, 1948)
D. trispinosa (Vanschuytbroeck, 1959)
D. tumida (Curran, 1931)
D. uelensis (Vanschuytbroeck, 1959)
D. upembaensis (Vanschuytbroeck, 1959)

References

Sphaeroceridae
Diptera of Africa
Schizophora genera